Oberried may refer to:

Oberried am Brienzersee, Switzerland
Oberried, Fribourg, Switzerland
Oberried, Germany

See also
Oberrieden